The term Song Shao Di (宋少帝) may refer to:

 Emperor Shao of Song (406–424) of the Liu Song Dynasty
 Zhao Bing (Emperor Bing of Song, 1272–1279) of the Song Dynasty